John Sutton of Lincoln (died c. 1391) was a Member of Parliament (MP) of the Parliament of England for Lincoln in 1369, 1372, 1373, October 1377 and February 1388. His brother Robert Sutton and his nephew Hamon Sutton were also MPs for Lincoln.

He was the Mayor of the Boston Staple for 1375–76 and 1384–85 and Mayor of Lincoln for 1386–87.

References

Year of birth missing
1391 deaths
English MPs 1369
Mayors of Lincoln, England
Members of the Parliament of England (pre-1707) for Lincoln
English MPs 1372
English MPs 1373
English MPs October 1377
English MPs February 1388